Plasmodium inopinatum is a parasite of the genus Plasmodium subgenus Vinckeia. As in all Plasmodium species, P. inopinatum has both vertebrate and insect hosts. The vertebrate hosts for this parasite are mammals.

Taxonomy 
The parasite was first described by Resseler in 1952.

Distribution 
This species was described in Belgium.

References 

inopinatum